Expeditie Robinson: 2005 was the sixth Dutch-Belgian version of the Swedish show Expedition Robinson, or Survivor as it is referred to in some countries. The season began airing on September 5, 2005, and concluded on November 28, 2005. The major twist this season was that the tribes were initially divided up by the participants' ages. The Jong (Young) tribe was composed of the contestants age 30 and under and the Oud (Old) tribe was composed of contestants over the age of 40. Unbeknownst to the original tribes, there was a secret third tribe that consisted of two contestants, Esther Jacobs and Marnix Allegaert, who were in their 30s, who lived in an area known as "Secret Island". These two contestants were soon joined by Douwe Popma, who had been voted out immediately after a challenge. In episode 4, the two original teams were dismantled and the remaining players were mixed up into new tribes known as the North and South teams. With these new tribes, all who had previously been living on the Secret island joined one of the two new tribes in the game and Nicole Hendriks, who had been eliminated in the previous episode, re-entered the game as a replacement for the large number of contestants who had left the game. Along with the new tribes came tribal leaders, who were elected in each episode and were immune at tribal council. 
When the two tribes merged into Mensirip in episode 7, a new voting system was set in place in which each contestant was given six votes that they could cast at any time they wish. If some of these votes were not cast and a contestant made it to the final, three all of their remaining votes would automatically transfer to jury votes. Another addition to the game that appeared after the merge was "Winners Island", when a contestant won immunity they would be sent to Winners Island following the next tribal council. Once at Winners Island, they would battle one of the two other residents in a duel to determine who would stay on the island. Along with these, when a contestant finished last in an immunity competition, they would earn a penalty vote at tribal council. When it came time for the final vote, the jury vote was combined with the votes each contestant had left to cast as well as a public vote. In the end, it was Belgian Marnix Allegaert who won the season over fellow Belgians Emma Bossche and Marleen Moer with an overall vote of 16–9–3.

Finishing order

Future Appearances
Maxime Verbist, Douwe Popma and Fleur Roozenburg returned to compete in Expeditie Robinson: Battle of the Titans.

Voting history

 Because of all the voluntary exits that had taken place in episode two, Nicole was not eliminated at the end of the third tribal council.

 As the leader of the South Team in episode 4, Esther had immunity at the fourth tribal council.

 As the leader of the South Team in episode 5, Esther had immunity at the fifth tribal council.

 At the fifth tribal council, all votes John would receive counted double, because he challenged leader Esther to a duel, and lost.

 As the leader of the South Team in episode 6, Carl had immunity at the sixth tribal council.

 Following the merge, each player was told that they had six votes, and only six votes, that they could use at any time throughout the remainder of the season.

 During the seventh tribal council, Carl and Marnix were both on winners island. Because of this neither could vote or be voted for at tribal council.

 In episode 8, Douwe came in last place at the immunity challenge. Because of this he received a penalty vote.

 During the eighth tribal council, Emma and Marnix were both on winners island. Because of this neither could vote or be voted for at tribal council.

 In episode 9, the winner of the reward challenge was allowed to give one penalty vote to the contestant of their choice. They chose to give it to Marleen

 During the ninth tribal council, Carl and Emma were both on winners island. Because of this neither could vote or be voted for at tribal council.

 In episode 10, the winner of the immunity challenge was allowed to give one penalty vote to the contestant of their choice. They chose to give it to Douwe.

 At the ninth tribal council, contestants were given the option to vote, to not vote, or to give away one of their votes in exchange for a letter from home.

 During the tenth tribal council, Emma was on winners island. Because of this she could not vote or be voted for at tribal council.

 In episode 11, the winner of the immunity challenge was allowed to give one penalty vote to the contestant of their choice. They chose to give it to Carl.

 During the eleventh tribal council, Emma has already secured a spot in the finalist-challenge. Because of this she could not vote or be voted for at tribal council.

 In episode 12, the winner of the immunity challenge was allowed to give one penalty vote to the contestant of their choice. They chose to give it to Meredith.

 The final jury vote was a tally of the juror's votes, all votes that each contestant had not cast from the six they were given when the tribes merged, votes won in challenges, and votes from a public vote.

References

External links
http://worldofbigbrother.com/Survivor/BN/6/about.shtml
https://web.archive.org/web/20100824010746/http://www.expeditie-robinson.tv/vorigeseizoenen/expeditierobinson2005/

Expeditie Robinson seasons
2005 Dutch television seasons
2005 Belgian television seasons